Ament Corners is an unincorporated community in Kendall County, in the U.S. state of Illinois.

The community was first settled in the early 1830s by the Ament brothers, and named for them.

References

Unincorporated communities in Kendall County, Illinois
1830s establishments in Illinois
Unincorporated communities in Illinois